Caroline Boudreaux is an American businesswoman and social entrepreneur. In 2000, she left her career in TV advertising to found Texas-based international nonprofit Miracle Foundation.

In 2009, she was recognized as one of 200 Young Global Leaders at the World Economic Forum in Davos, Switzerland. She was named a global visionary by UBS in February 2017.

References

Living people
American women in business
1969 births
21st-century American women